Byron Froese (born March 12, 1991) is a Canadian professional ice hockey centre. He currently plays with the Henderson Silver Knights in the American Hockey League (AHL) while under contract to the Vegas Golden Knights in the National Hockey League (NHL). Froese was selected by the Chicago Blackhawks in the fourth round (119th overall) of the 2009 NHL Entry Draft.

Playing career
On May 31, 2011, the Chicago Blackhawks of the NHL signed Froese to a three-year entry level contract. He split the majority of his contract between affiliates, the Rockford IceHogs of the American Hockey League and the Toledo Walleye of the ECHL.

In the final year of his entry level deal with the Blackhawks in the 2013–14 season, he was reassigned from the IceHogs to the Cincinnati Cyclones, where he largely contributed to their Kelly Cup final appearance with 25 points in 23 games. As a free agent from the Blackhawks, Froese opted to remain with the Cyclones, signing a one-year deal on August 14, 2014.

Froese was loaned by the Cyclones to the San Antonio Rampage to begin the 2014–15 season. After he was returned to Cincinnati, he was later loaned to the Toronto Marlies. In a successful stint with the Marlies, Froese was signed for the remainder of the season by the Marlies on January 7, 2015.

On July 3, 2015, Froese was signed by the Marlies parent affiliate, the Toronto Maple Leafs, to a two-year contract. Early into the 2015–16 season, Froese received his first recall from the Marlies to the NHL on October 23, 2015. On the following day, Froese made his NHL debut with the Maple Leafs in a 5-3 defeat to the Montreal Canadiens. On December 19, 2015, Froese scored his first NHL goal against the Kings. Froese would finish the season with just 5 points in 56 games, but he earned high praise from both coach Mike Babcock and the media for his great defensive play.

In the 2016–17 season, on February 27, 2017, Froese was traded by the Maple Leafs to the Tampa Bay Lightning along with a conditional second round draft choice in 2017 in exchange for centre Brian Boyle.

On July 1, 2017, having left the Lightning as a free agent, Froese agreed to two-year contract with the Montreal Canadiens, with the final season of his deal played on a one-way basis. In the 2017–18 season, Froese was initially assigned to inaugural AHL affiliate, the Laval Rocket. As captain of the Rocket, he appeared in just 13 games with the club before he was recalled to the Canadiens on November 8, 2017. On December 22, 2017, Froese scored his first goal with the Canadiens against the Calgary Flames. Froese played out the remainder of the season with the Canadiens, notching career NHL highs with 3 goals and 11 points in 46 games.

In the following 2018–19 season, Froese was re-assigned to the Rocket and selected as captain. He scored 30 points through 46 games for the Rocket before he was traded by the Canadiens, alongside David Schlemko, to the Philadelphia Flyers in exchange for Dale Weise and Christian Folin on February 9, 2019.

On July 1, 2019, Froese signed as a free agent to a one-year, two-way contract with the Calgary Flames.

On July 13, 2022, Froese signed as a free agent to a two-year, two-way contract with the Vegas Golden Knights.

Career statistics

Regular season and playoffs

International

References

External links

1991 births
Living people
Calgary Flames players
Canadian ice hockey centres
Chicago Blackhawks draft picks
Cincinnati Cyclones (ECHL) players
Everett Silvertips players
Henderson Silver Knights players
Ice hockey people from Manitoba
Laval Rocket players
Lehigh Valley Phantoms players
Montreal Canadiens players
Red Deer Rebels players
Rockford IceHogs (AHL) players
San Antonio Rampage players
Sportspeople from Winkler, Manitoba
Stockton Heat players
Syracuse Crunch players
Tampa Bay Lightning players
Toledo Walleye players
Toronto Maple Leafs players
Toronto Marlies players
Vegas Golden Knights players